Luxembourg competed at the 1984 Summer Paralympics in Stoke Mandeville, Great Britain and New York City, United States. 5 competitors from Luxembourg won 6 medals including 1 gold, 4 silver and 1 bronze and finished 30th in the medal table.

See also 
 Luxembourg at the Paralympics
 Luxembourg at the 1984 Summer Olympics

References 

Luxembourg at the Paralympics
1984 in Luxembourgian sport
Nations at the 1984 Summer Paralympics